The Women's Football Superleague of Kosovo, also known as the SIGAL Women's Superleague for sponsorship reasons with SIGAL, is the top women's association football division of the Kosovo football league system. The league is organized by the Football Federation of Kosovo and the division currently has an eight-team format.

History
The league was founded in 2010 under the name Kosovo Women's Football League, a name it kept until August 2022, when the Football Federation of Kosovo decided to change the organizational structure of women's football competitions in Kosovo, where from this change, the name was changed to the Women's Football Superleague of Kosovo and the format was changed to eight-team format, while the teams under the best eight will automatically be relegated to the newly formed Women's First Football League of Kosovo.

Names

Clubs (2022–23)

Note: Table lists in alphabetical order.

Season standings

Current season

Previous seasons

2021–22

2020–21

2019–20

2018–19

2017–18

2016–17

Titles by club

Women's Football Superleague of Kosovo clubs in Europe

UEFA Women's Champions League
Hajvalia secured qualifying by entering at the qualifying round in the UEFA Women's Champions League for the first time in the 2016–17 season. Besides Hajvalia, even Mitrovica will compete in the UEFA Women's Champions League for the first time in the 2018–19 season, entering during the qualifying round.

References

External links
 

Sports leagues established in 2011
Women
Top level women's association football leagues in Europe
Women's sports leagues in Kosovo